Sandwich pickle may refer to:

Branston Pickle, a United Kingdom brand of jarred pickled relish
Piccalilli, a pickle of chopped vegetables and hot spices
Mixed pickle, various pickled fruits and vegetables
Pickled cucumber, sliced lengthwise and layered into a sandwich